Tunis R. Cooper House is located in Bergenfield, Bergen County, New Jersey, United States. The house was built in 1802 and was added to the National Register of Historic Places on September 6, 1995.

The house is named after Tunis R. Cooper, a tycoon who made chairs in a factory located on the same property. The borough acquired the building sometime after 2002. It included a preservation easement stating it was to be used as a museum and now houses Bergenfield Museum Society.

See also
National Register of Historic Places listings in Bergen County, New Jersey

References

Bergenfield, New Jersey
Houses completed in 1802
Houses on the National Register of Historic Places in New Jersey
Houses in Bergen County, New Jersey
National Register of Historic Places in Bergen County, New Jersey
New Jersey Register of Historic Places